Murder at Covent Garden is a 1932 British crime film directed by Leslie S. Hiscott and starring Dennis Neilson-Terry, Anne Grey, George Curzon and Walter Fitzgerald. It was made at Twickenham Studios. The screenplay involves a detective who investigates the murder of a night club owner.

Plot
A detective goes undercover and poses as a criminal to try to discover the reasons behind the murder of a night club owner.

Cast
 Dennis Neilson-Terry as Jack Trencham
 Anne Grey as Helen Osmond
 Walter Fitzgerald as Donald Walpace
 Henri De Vries as Van Blond
 George Curzon as Belmont

References

Bibliography
 Low, Rachael. Filmmaking in 1930s Britain. George Allen & Unwin, 1985.
 Wood, Linda. British Films, 1927-1939. British Film Institute, 1986.

External links 
 

1932 films
1932 crime films
British crime films
1930s English-language films
Films directed by Leslie S. Hiscott
Films set in London
Films shot at Twickenham Film Studios
British black-and-white films
1930s British films